is a Japanese former figure skater. She is the 1995 Japanese national champion. Her highest placement at the World Figure Skating Championships was 10th, which she achieved in 1995 and 1996. Yokoya retired from competitive skating following the 1998-1999 season. She currently works as a coach.

Competitive highlights
GP: Champions Series / Grand Prix

References
 Skatabase: 1990s Worlds Results

Navigation

Japanese female single skaters
Living people
1978 births
Competitors at the 1999 Winter Universiade